Rajgir Mahotsav or festival, formerly Rajgir Nritaya (Dance) Mahotsav, is a festival of dance and music. It is an annual three-day event in Rajgir, Bihar, India, that was first held in 1986. It is organized by the Nalanda district administration with the help of the Government of Bihar’s Department of Culture and Bihar State Tourism Development Corporation.

Overview
Bindeshwari Dubey, the then Chief Minister of Bihar, had inaugurated the festival in Swarna Bhadar area of Rajgir on 4 April 1986. The Tourism Department of Bihar Government had sponsored festival until 1989. After 1989, event abandoned for reasons unknown. Few years later in 1994, it was again started and since then, it is an annual event in the calendar of Bihar Government.

Various competitions on Tonga race, martial arts competitions, mehndi contest, mahila utsav, food plaza, gramshree mela etc. have been introduced recently besides organizing performance by artists of national and international repute. Qila Maidan located in the backdrop of Ratnagiri hills is its current venue. In 2016, Rajgir Mahotsav was organized from 25 to 27 November.

In 2017, Rajgir Mahotsav will be organized from 25 to 27 November.

After Successful Rajgir Mahotsav of 2019, Rajgir Mahotsav of 2020 was cancelled due to the COVID-19 pandemic. Mukesh Kumar, manager at a hotel run by the BSTDC said that in 2020 also, majority of the state tourism functions were cancelled due to Covid. “Events like Buddha Purnima, Rajgir Mahotsav and Sonepur fair had to be cancelled,” he said.

References

Festivals in Bihar
Nalanda district
Culture of Bihar
1986 establishments in Bihar
Music festivals established in 1986
Rajgir